Tamara Beccam Mello is an American actress. She is of Mexican descent on her mother's side and Portuguese Azorean and French descent on her father's side.

Career

Her career began in 1993 with appearances on various television programs and films.  She has appeared in the TV series 7th Heaven, Boy Meets World, and Diagnosis: Murder and in the films The Brady Bunch Movie and She's All That.

In 1999, she appeared in the TV series Popular as Lily, the politically correct vegetarian. Following 2 seasons on Popular Tamara continued to work in theater, film and television before taking several years off to raise her daughter. She has recently returned to acting and has  worked sporadically, limited to mainly guest appearances on television shows such as the pilot for the comedy Worst Week and a 2013 episode of The Mentalist, and she now lives in Los Angeles. In January/February 2009, she also appeared in T-Mobile Blackberry Pearl Flip television commercials alongside Danny Pudi campaigning against "butt-dialing".

Filmography

Film

Television

References

External links

Official facebook Page

1976 births
Living people
20th-century American actresses
21st-century American actresses
American people of Portuguese descent
Actresses from Orange County, California
American child actresses
American film actresses
American television actresses